Suffolk Coastal was a local government district in Suffolk, England.  Its council was based in Melton, having moved from neighbouring Woodbridge in 2017. Other towns include Felixstowe, Framlingham, Leiston, Aldeburgh, and Saxmundham.

The district was formed on 1 April 1974, under the Local Government Act 1972, as a merger of the municipal borough of Aldeburgh, along with Felixstowe, Leiston-cum-Sizewell, Saxmundham and Woodbridge urban districts, and Blyth Rural District and Deben Rural District. The population of the district was 124,298 at the 2011 Census.

Suffolk Coastal district was merged with Waveney district on 1 April 2019 to form the new East Suffolk district.

Election results
There were new ward boundaries in 2003 and 2015.

Wards represented
Below is a list of wards with the number of councillors they returned in the relevant periods. There were 118 civil parishes and towns distributed amongst these wards.

Arms

References

External links
District Council website

 
Non-metropolitan districts of Suffolk
East Suffolk (district)
Former non-metropolitan districts